Sir Robert King, 1st Baronet PC (I) (circa 1625 – March 1707) was an Anglo-Irish politician.

King was the second son of Sir Robert King and his first wife Frances Folliott, daughter of Henry Folliott, 1st Baron Folliott and Anne Strode. He represented the seat of Ballyshannon in the Irish House of Commons between 1661 and 1666. On 27 September 1682 he was created a Baronet, of Boyle Abbey, in the Baronetage of Ireland. He sat for Roscommon County from 1692 to 1693 and again from 1696 to 1699. In 1695 he was made a member of the Privy Council of Ireland. He finally sat for Boyle between 1703 and his death in 1707.

He married Frances Gore, daughter of Lt-Col Henry Gore and Mary Blayney. He was succeeded by his eldest son, John King. A descendant of his second son, Henry King, was created Earl of Kingston in 1768.

References

|-

Year of birth unknown
1707 deaths
17th-century Anglo-Irish people
18th-century Anglo-Irish people
Baronets in the Baronetage of Ireland
Irish MPs 1692–1693
Irish MPs 1695–1699
Irish MPs 1703–1713
Robert
Members of the Privy Council of Ireland
Members of the Parliament of Ireland (pre-1801) for County Roscommon constituencies
Year of birth uncertain